Haemo- is a word prefix that refers to blood, derived from the Greek word  (haima). Numerous medical and scientific terms incorporate the prefix, some of which can in turn be abbreviated as 'haemo'. These include:

 Haemoglobin, a protein carried by red blood cells
 Haemodialysis, direct dialysis of the blood (as distinct from indirect peritoneal dialysis)
 Haemodynamics, the study of blood flow
 Haemopathology, the study of blood diseases
 Various species of blood parasite
 Haemophilia, a blood disease, or its sufferers, haemophiliacs